Victor George (10 April 1955 – 9 July 2001) was an Indian photographer who died while photographing landslides in Kerala. He was the chief photographer of the Malayala Manorama.

Early life
George was born in the Pattithananm-Kanakkary village, Kottayam district, Kerala. He studied English literature at university. His brother introduced him to photography.

Career
In 1981, George joined Malayala Manorama, a Malayalam daily. From 1985 to 1990, he worked in their Delhi bureau. The photographs taken by him during the 1986 National Games won him initial recognition in the field. His shots of the swimmer Anita Sood with Kavita Sood cheering her from the gallery during the women's 400-metre freestyle brought George instant recognition. His photograph of the Indian relay team dropping the baton in a disastrous finish at the 1989 South Asian Federation Games, Kolkata, was widely appreciated.

In 1990, George became the Chief Photographer of Malayala Manorama.

Death
On 9 July 2001, George set out from Kottayam to cover a landslide that had claimed three lives in Cheppukulam, near Thodupuzha, in the hilly Idukki district of Kerala. That afternoon, torrential rains triggered another landslide in Venniyani Mala, which killed George. His remains were recovered  from the site of the landslide two days later.

References

External links
 The Hindu - Light, shade and rain
Victor George
It's Raining - The great rain book by Victor George

20th-century Indian photographers
1955 births
2001 deaths
People from Kottayam district
Journalists from Kerala
Indian photojournalists
Indian male journalists
20th-century Indian journalists
Photographers from Kerala